Wojciech Sylwester Piotr Rubinowicz (February 22, 1889 – October 13, 1974) was a Polish theoretical physicist who made contributions in quantum mechanics, mathematical physics, and the theory of radiation. He is known for the Maggie-Rubinowicz representation of Gustav Kirchhoff’s diffraction formula.

Life and career
He was born in Sadagóra, Bukovina, in the Austro-Hungarian Empire  the son of Margaret Brodowska and Damian Rubinowicz, Polish patriot and insurgent of the January Uprising of 1863. In 1908, Rubinowicz began his studies at the University of Czernowitz, and he was awarded his doctorate in 1914. In 1916 he began postgraduate studies at the University of Munich under Arnold Sommerfeld and eventually becoming his assistant. In 1918, he became a Privatdozent at the University of Czernowitz. Two years later he took an appointment as professor at the University of Ljubljana, Yugoslavia. He became a professor at the Polytechnic Institute of Lwów, in 1922. During the period from 1937 to 1941, he was a professor at the John Casimir  University of Lwów.  After World War II, starting in 1946, he was professor of theoretical physics at the University of Warsaw until 1960. He served as president of the Polish Physical Society between 1949–1952 and 1961–1974.

While at Munich, Rubinowicz published contributions to radiation theory and to three of Sommerfeld’s major interests, i.e., Sommerfeld’s extension of Bohr’s theory of the atom and both mathematical physics and diffraction theory; he carried these topical interests throughout his career.  He eventually published books based on his mathematical physics interests as well as diffraction theory:  his work on the polynomial method of solving eigenvalue problems in quantum mechanics was described in "Sommerfeldsche Polynommethode" and his work on diffraction theory, was published in "Die Beugungswelle in der Kirchhoffschen Theorie der Beugung".

Also while at Munich, Rubinowicz transformed the Kirchhoff diffraction integral into what has become known as the Rubinowicz representation (also known as the Maggie-Rubinowicz representation) for which scalar and electromagnetic fields are interpreted as a transformation of a surface integral into a line integral  – an independent and slightly different derivation from that done in 1888 by G. A. Maggi, one of Gustav Kirchhoff's students in Berlin. Rubinowicz’s form of the representation, as opposed to Maggi’s, is now more commonly accepted.

The circle of his disciples and associates included in Lwów Jan Blaton, Wanda Hanusowa, Roman Stanisław Ingarden, Wasyl Milianczuk, Jerzy Rayski, Kazimierz Vetulani, in Warsaw Bohdan Karczewski, Wojciech Królikowski, Adam Kujawski, Jan Petykiewicz, Jerzy Plebański.

He died in Warsaw, Poland.

Books
 Adalbert Rubinowicz  "Die Beugungswelle in der Kirchhoffschen Theorie der Beugung" (1957, 1966)
 Adalbert Rubinowicz  "Quantum Mechanics" (1968)
 Adalbert Rubinowicz "Sommerfeldsche Polynommethode: Die Grundlehren der mathematischen Wissenschaften in Einzeldarstellungen mit besonderer Berücksichtigung der Anwendungsgebiete" (Polnischer Verl. d. Wissenschaften, 1972)
 Adalbert Rubinowicz "Selected Papers" (Polish Scientific Publishers PWN, Warsaw 1975)

Notes

References
 Mehra, Jagdish, and Helmut Rechenberg The Historical Development of Quantum Theory. Volume 1 Part 1 The Quantum Theory of Planck, Einstein, Bohr and Sommerfeld 1900 – 1925: Its Foundation and the Rise of Its Difficulties. (Springer, 1982) 
 Arnold Sommerfeld, translated from the first German edition by Otto Laporte and Peter A. Moldauer "Optics - Lectures on Theoretical Physics Volume IV" (Academic Press, 1964)

External links

 Interview American Institute of Physics 18th May 1963

1889 births
1974 deaths
Scientists from Chernivtsi
Chernivtsi University alumni
20th-century Polish physicists
Quantum physicists
Members of the Polish Academy of Sciences
People from the Duchy of Bukovina
Polish Austro-Hungarians
Academic staff of the University of Warsaw
Academic staff of the University of Lviv
Academic staff of the University of Ljubljana
Academic staff of Chernivtsi University
Ludwig Maximilian University of Munich alumni